The Ladies Swiss Open is a women's professional golf tournament on the Ladies European Tour that is held in Switzerland. It was first played in 1996 and 1997, the first LET event in Switzerland since the Ladies Swiss Classic (1988–1990). It was played 2006–2012 with Deutsche Bank as the title sponsor. After a 8 year hiatus it returned to the LET schedule again in 2020, this time with Liechtenstein-based VP Bank as title sponsor.

Winners

See also
Ladies Swiss Classic

References

External links

Ladies European Tour

Swiss Open
Golf tournaments in Switzerland
Recurring sporting events established in 1988